Albert A. Solliday (February 13, 1841December 13, 1924) was an American dentist, soldier, and politician.  He was the 24th mayor of Watertown, Wisconsin, and represented Jefferson County in the Wisconsin State Senate from 1892 to 1899.

Biography

Born in Lehigh County, Pennsylvania, Solliday graduated from Circleville High School in Circleville, Ohio. During the American Civil War, Solliday served as a musician in Company A of the 114th Ohio Infantry Regiment.  He remained through the entire service of the regiment, from Fall 1862 through July 1865.

In 1868, Solliday moved to Watertown, Wisconsin where he worked in the dentistry profession. Solliday served on the Watertown school board and the Watertown common council, and was elected mayor for two consecutive terms, in 1884 and 1885.

During these years, he also became active with the Wisconsin National Guard and was captain of the "Watertown Rifles" guard company.  He was promoted to adjutant of the 2nd Wisconsin Infantry Regiment in 1888, then major for the 1st battalion of the regiment in 1892, and finally was promoted to lieutenant colonel of the regiment in 1895.

In the Fall of 1891, Wisconsin state senator Walter S. Greene died in office.  As it became obvious that special sessions of the Legislature would be needed to deal with redistricting in 1892, a special election was called in the Spring of 1892 to fill his seat.  Solliday was the Democratic nominee in the special election, and went on to win with 59% of the vote.  He went on to win election to a full four year term at the 1894 general election.

At the outbreak of the Spanish–American War, Solliday was still serving as lieutenant colonel of the 2nd Wisconsin Infantry Regiment and mustered into federal service with the regiment.  They participated in the Puerto Rico campaign in 1898, and occupied the cities of Ponce and Coamo.  Hostilities ended in August 1898, and the regiment returned to Wisconsin in September.

The regiment was mustered out in November 1898, and Solliday was then appointed quartermaster and commissary general for the state of Wisconsin, with the rank of brigadier general.  He served just over two years in this role after the war.

Solliday died at his home in Watertown, Wisconsin.

Electoral history

Wisconsin Senate (1892, 1894)

| colspan="6" style="text-align:center;background-color: #e9e9e9;"| Special Election, May 24, 1892

| colspan="6" style="text-align:center;background-color: #e9e9e9;"| General Election, November 6, 1894

References

External links
Watertown Historical Society-Colonel Albert A. Solliday

1841 births
1924 deaths
People from Lehigh County, Pennsylvania
People from Circleville, Ohio
Politicians from Watertown, Wisconsin
People of Ohio in the American Civil War
American military personnel of the Spanish–American War
Military personnel from Wisconsin
American dentists
School board members in Wisconsin
Wisconsin city council members
Mayors of places in Wisconsin
Democratic Party Wisconsin state senators